The Great and the Little Love is a 1938 German comedy film directed by Josef von Báky and starring Jenny Jugo, Gustav Fröhlich, Rudi Godden. Jugo plays a stewardess working for Lufthansa. It was shot at the Johannisthal Studios in Berlin with sets designed by the art directors Karl Weber and Erich Zander. It was filmed partly on location around Genoa in Italy.

Plot 
During a stopover in Zurich, the stewardess Erika Berghoff spends some time with the passenger Dr. Bordam. She already liked him on the flight, but now she has fallen in love with him. What she doesn't know is that Bordam is actually a prince traveling anonymously and is already engaged to Princess Irina. However, when he learns later in the story that Erika is ill, he drops everything to visit her immediately. She feels better in his presence and both spend a wonderful, harmonious time in Italy. What started out as a little love has now turned into a big love.

However, when Erika finds out who Bordum really is and that he is already engaged, she drops all thoughts of him and wants nothing to do with him anymore. However, he has also fallen in love with Erika and is now leaving his past behind in order to spend the future together with Erika.

Cast
Jenny Jugo as Erika Berghoff, Stewardeß
Gustav Fröhlich as Prinz Louis Alexander alias Dr. Alexander Bordam
Rudi Godden as Der Bordfunker
Maria Koppenhöfer as Die Königinmutter
Aribert Wäscher as Ein Gast im Café
Kurt Seifert as Heinrod
Gertrud de Lalsky as Frau Berghoff, Erikas Mutter
Flockina von Platen as Dr. Bordams französische Freundin
Walter Steinbeck as Der Ministerpräsident
Walter Werner as Erikas Vater
Elisabeth Eygk as Prinzessin Irina
Günther Hadank as Der König
Hans Kettler as Erster Pilot der Fluglinie
Hans Meyer-Hanno as Pilot
Georg H. Schnell as Der amerikanische Flugpassagier
Alfred Heynisch as Flugpassagier
Hans Schneider as Der Co-Pilot
Walter Schenk as Ein italienischer Flugpassagier
Klaus Pohl as Ein besorgter Flugpassagier
Walter Lieck as Peter Siebert, der blinde Flugpassagier
Albert Ihle as Flugpassagier
Michele Danton as Der italienische Kellner im Gartenrestaurant
Alfred Karen as Der Pokalüberreicher
Annemarie Steinsieck as Begleiterin
Herbert Weissbach as Der 'Kenner' am Billardtisch
Max Mothes as Der Hotelportier in Zürich
Gustav Püttjer as Ein Flugmechaniker
Jac Diehl as Ein Bildreporter
Hans Leibelt
Gustav Waldau
Erika von Thellmann

References

External links

Films of Nazi Germany
German comedy films
1938 comedy films
Films shot in Italy
Films directed by Josef von Báky
German aviation films
Tobis Film films
German black-and-white films
1930s German films
Films shot at Johannisthal Studios